Marc Cooper Sullivan  (born July 25, 1958) is an American former professional baseball catcher who played for five Major League Baseball (MLB) seasons with the Boston Red Sox.

Career
Sullivan was born in Quincy, Massachusetts.  He is the son of former Red Sox player and general manager Haywood Sullivan. He played college baseball for the University of Florida. In 1977, he played collegiate summer baseball with the Orleans Cardinals of the Cape Cod Baseball League, and returned to the league in 1978 to play for the Chatham A's. Sullivan was selected by his father for the Red Sox in the second round of the 1979 MLB Draft.

Sullivan was known as a defensive specialist and he managed a lifetime major league batting average of just .186 with a .236 on-base average and a slugging percentage of .258 in 360 at bats. He was traded to the Houston Astros in 1987 but never appeared in a game for their major league club.

See also 

 Florida Gators
 List of Florida Gators baseball players
 List of second-generation Major League Baseball players

References

External links 

RBI baseball

1958 births
Living people
All-American college baseball players
American expatriate baseball players in Canada
Baseball players from Massachusetts
Boston Red Sox players
Bristol Red Sox players
Chatham Anglers players
Colorado Springs Sky Sox players
Florida Gators baseball players
Maine Phillies players
Major League Baseball catchers
New Britain Red Sox players
Orleans Firebirds players
Pawtucket Red Sox players
People from Canton, Massachusetts
Sportspeople from Quincy, Massachusetts
Texas Rangers scouts
Vancouver Canadians players
Winston-Salem Red Sox players
Winter Haven Red Sox players